Heliodoro "Jabuco" Hidalgo (1881 – death date unknown) was a Cuban baseball center fielder in the Cuban League and Negro leagues. He played from 1901 to 1915 with several Cuban ballclubs. He was elected to the Cuban Baseball Hall of Fame in 1943.

References

External links

1881 births
Year of death missing
Cuban League players
Cuban baseball players
Sportspeople from Matanzas
All Cubans players
Almendares (baseball) players
Cuban Stars (West) players
San Francisco Park players
Club Fé players
Habana players
Azul (baseball) players
Baseball outfielders